Arne Sørensen (20 October 1911 – 6 March 1995) was a Norwegian footballer. He played in one match for the Norway national football team in 1935.

References

External links
 

1911 births
1995 deaths
Norwegian footballers
Norway international footballers
Place of birth missing
Association footballers not categorized by position